Dialectica japonica is a moth of the family Gracillariidae. It is known from Kyūshū, Japan.

The wingspan is 7.5–8.6 mm.

The larvae feed on Ehretia ovalifolia. They mine the leaves of their host plant.

References

Dialectica (moth)
Moths of Japan
Moths described in 1988